Gen Mobile is an American wireless service provider. It is a subsidiary of Dish Wireless. Gen Mobile provides wireless service using the T-Mobile network, and prior to the merger between T-Mobile US and  Sprint Corporation,  delivered service using the Sprint network.

History
Gen Mobile was founded in February 2018 by Robert Yap along with his brother, Michael Yap, and several telecom executives in Redondo Beach, California and launched on July 25, 2018. It used the Sprint network to provide service. The company is focused on providing affordable plans to customers.

Dish Wireless acquired Gen Mobile on September 1, 2021.

References

External links
 

Telecommunications companies established in 2018
Mobile phone companies of the United States
Dish Network